Mount Pleasant School District (MPSD) was a school district headquartered in Mount Pleasant, Arkansas. It had a single school, the Mount Pleasant School.

On July 1, 2004, the Mount Pleasant School District was merged into the Melbourne School District.

References

External links
 

Defunct school districts in Arkansas
Education in Izard County, Arkansas
2004 disestablishments in Arkansas
School districts disestablished in 2004